Alan Geoffrey Serle  (10 March 1922 – 27 April 1998), known as Geoff, was an Australian historian, who is best known for his books on the colony of Victoria; The Golden Age (1963) and The Rush to be Rich (1971) and his biographies of John Monash, John Curtin and Robin Boyd.

Early life
Serle was born on 10 March 1922, in the Melbourne suburb of Hawthorn, the son of Percival Serle and Dora, née Hake. He attended Scotch College and briefly read history at the University of Melbourne before joining the Second Australian Imperial Force in 1941. He was seriously wounded in action at Finschhafen, New Guinea. He was discharged in 1944, and resumed study at the University of Melbourne, also being active in the University Labour Club. In 1946, he completed a Bachelor of Arts (Honours) degree and won a Rhodes Scholarship. This enabled him to enter University College, Oxford, where he graduated with a doctorate in 1950.

Academic career
From 1950 Serle taught Australian History at the University of Melbourne, and after 1961 was Reader in History at the newly established Monash University. His first book appeared in 1957; The Melbourne Scene was a selection of documents relating to Victoria and was edited with James Grant.

Serle was active in the establishment of the Victorian branch of the Australian Fabian Society and in establishing the Friends of the La Trobe Library in 1966.  He was also closely associated with Meanjin and Overland magazines. Serle also edited Volumes 7–11 of the Australian Dictionary of Biography (Volumes 7–10 with Bede Nairn).

John Ritchie's entry in the Australian Dictionary of Biography makes pointed reference to Serle's passion for Australia. When Ritchie sent him a letter from London in 1972 "extolling the virtues of England, [Serle] sent a postcard in reply: on one side it had a painting by Tom Roberts, on the other he wrote, aut Australia, aut nihil."

Serle was appointed an Officer of the Order of Australia in 1986. He married Jessie Macdonald in 1955, and together they had a daughter and three sons.

Personal life

On 12 January 1955 Serle married Jessie Macdonald, an art historian, with whom he had four children: Oenone, Donald, Jamie and Richard.

Serle's background was "middle-class, Protestant and Melburnian". Serle was known in his youth for his sporting prowess and in his middle age for being an "enthusiastic spectator". In John Ritchie's obituary, Serle is described as "incisive and insightful, pragmatic and down-to-earth, left-leaning in his political sympathies without being dogmatic, he was gentle in nature, thoughtful in temperament, egalitarian in outlook, exceptionally hard-working, and a loyal friend. He enjoyed a can of beer, a glass of wine, a cigarette and his pipe. In private life, he succeeded in the three things that matter most, as a son, a husband and a father."

Published works

References

1922 births
1998 deaths
Alumni of University College, Oxford
Australian people of English descent
Australian Army soldiers
Australian biographers
Male biographers
Australian Army personnel of World War II
Australian Rhodes Scholars
Academics from Melbourne
Australian historians
Historians of Australia
Officers of the Order of Australia
People educated at Scotch College, Melbourne
University of Melbourne alumni
Academic staff of the University of Melbourne
20th-century biographers
20th-century male writers
20th-century Australian historians
People from Hawthorn, Victoria
Military personnel from Melbourne
Writers from Melbourne